Annimari Katriina Korte OLY (born 8 April 1988 in Kirkkonummi, Finland) is a Finnish 100 meter hurdler and a sports journalist. Her personal best and national record (24 July 2019 in Joensuu) of 12.72 makes her the fastest Finnish woman of all time in 100 meter hurdles.  She had to retire from athletics in 2012 due to illnesses. She was diagnosed with an eosinophilic esophagitis and Tietze syndrome. She started athletics again in 2017. She represented Finland at the 2019 World Championships Women's 100 metres hurdles and qualified for the semi-finals.
She represented Finland at the 2020 Summer Olympics.
She has a Master’s degree in Sports Journalism from St Mary’s University in London and a Bachelor’s degree in Communication Studies from Clemson University. She has also studied in University of Georgia and San Diego State University.

References

External links
 
 Annimari Korte Official Homepage
 

1988 births
Living people
Finnish female hurdlers
Finnish expatriate sportspeople in Spain
People from Kirkkonummi
Athletes (track and field) at the 2020 Summer Olympics
Olympic athletes of Finland
Sportspeople from Uusimaa